Khulan (– ) was an empress consort of Genghis Khan and head of the second Court of Genghis Khan. Her status in the Mongol Empire was second only to Grand Empress Börte.

Biography
Khulan was a daughter of Dair-Usun, Uvas Mergid chief. She was offered to Genghis Khan as a gift after the chief's surrender. Genghis Khan was enamored with Khulan and following his coronation as Khan, installed her as an empress. She had a son, Gelejian, with Genghis Khan, and Gelejian's status was second only to Börte's four sons as he grew up.

As Genghis Khan's wife

Like his other wives, Khulan had her own ordo, or court. She was given the Khentii Mountains as her territory.

Genghis Khan was very fond of Abika Khulan, and most of the time she was the only empress accompanying him on many campaigns, notably the western campaign against the Khwarezmid Empire. She continued to travel with Genghis Khan until she died during one of Genghis Khan's campaign against India. She was buried under thick ice.

As one of many wives of Genghis Khan, Abika Khulan held a special place both in the Mongol Empire and in Genghis Khan's heart.

Popular culture

Khulan was portrayed in the 2007 Japanese film Genghis Khan: To the Ends of the Earth and Sea, played by South Korean actress and model Go Ara.

References

Citations

Sources 

 

 
Genghis Khan
Year of birth uncertain
12th-century births
13th-century deaths
12th-century Mongolian women
13th-century Mongolian women
Women in 12th-century warfare
Women in war in East Asia
Mongol empresses
Wives of Genghis Khan